"The Fly" is a song written by John Medora and David White and performed by Chubby Checker.  
The song was produced by Kal Mann.

Background
This song featured an electric shaver, which made the sound effects of the buzzing fly.

Chart performance
"The Fly" reached #7 on the U.S. pop chart, #11 on the U.S. R&B chart, and #35 in Australia in 1961.  It was featured on his 1961 album For 'Teen Twisters Only.
The song ranked #70 on Billboard magazine's Top 100 singles of 1961.

Other versions
Brendan Bowyer with The Royal Showband Waterford released a version of the song as a single in 1966, but it did not chart.

In popular culture
Checker's version was featured in the 1962 film Don't Knock the Twist and was included on the soundtrack.
Checker's version was featured in the 1988 film Hairspray, however, due to licensing restrictions with Cameo-Parkway Records, was not included on the soundtrack.
The song was mentioned in the Ernie Mareska song " Shout, Shout"( Knock Yourself Out) (1962)
The song is mentioned in the Orlons song "Wah Watusi". (1962)

References

1961 songs
1961 singles
1966 singles
Songs about dancing
Songs written by John Medora
Songs written by David White (musician)
Chubby Checker songs
Cameo-Parkway Records singles
His Master's Voice singles